Ash Black Bufflo, sometimes spelled Buffalo, is the professional name of Portland-based music composer and experimental musician Jay Clarke. He composes music for feature-length films, short films, documentaries, and dance and theater projects. He is notable for scoring the music for the documentary Marwencol which won the Jury Prize at the South by Southwest film festival and received positive critical attention. He created soundscapes for theatrical productions such as My Mind Is Like an Open Meadow, which received positive reviews in Willamette Week. He performs and records with numerous Portland-area bands including Dolorean, Holy Sons, Grails, and others. Clarke landed a record deal with Knitting Factory Records, and there are plans to release his debut CD entitled Andasol using the name Ash Black Bufflo in 2011.

A review in MVRemix Urban described the album Andasol as being:

Clarke explained his use of tone clusters in a theatrical production as a way to heighten dramatic suspense:

Discography
 Andasol, Knitting Factory Records, released May 2011

References

External links
 Official website
 Ash Black Bufflo on Knitting Factory Records website
 
 

Rock music groups from Oregon
American progressive rock groups
American experimental musical groups
Musicians from Portland, Oregon
American sound designers
American film score composers
American male film score composers
2000 establishments in Oregon
Musical groups established in 2000
Knitting Factory Records artists